The Special Representative on Combatting Islamophobia is a Canadian Federal Government office created in January 2023.

Description 
The Special Representative on Combatting Islamophobia role is four year term, appointed by the federal government of Canada.

History 
In June 2022, the federal government of Canada announced plans to create the office.

On January 26, 2023, Prime Minister Justin Trudeau appointed Amira Elghawaby as Canada's first representative. The office was allocated a budget of $5.6 million to cover the first five years of activities.

References

External links 

 Official website

2023 establishments in Canada
Islamophobia in Canada